Liberty County Airport may refer to:

 Liberty County Airport (Georgia) in Liberty County, Georgia, United States (FAA: 2J2)
 Liberty County Airport (Montana) in Liberty County, Montana, United States (FAA: LTY)
 Liberty Municipal Airport in Liberty County, Texas, United States (FAA: T78)
 MidCoast Regional Airport at Wright Army Airfield in Liberty County, Georgia, United States (FAA: LHW)

See also
 Liberty Airport (disambiguation)